Surprise (simplified Chinese: 万万没想到) is a 2013–2015 Chinese web series directed by Jiaoshou. It was first released on August 6, 2013 on Youku. The show ran for 3 seasons.

In 2015, Jiaoshou directed a major motion picture based on this show, also titled Surprise.

Synopsis 
Surprise tells an inconceivable story of Wang Dachui (White. K), a young loser, in an exaggerated and humorous way. As a famous loser in career, medical science, and engagement, his daily life is colorful and unpredictable. The story is combined with funny elements, transcending time and career life. Ranging from the current hot topics to the classic stories in history are included in the plot.

Cast 
 White. K as Wang Dachui, the main protagonist of the movie.
 Jiaoshou as the Tang Sanzang
 Kong Lianshun as the Beauty
 Liu Xunzimo as Sun Wukong, the Monkey King
 Zhang Benyu as Liu Bei
 Ge Bu as Xiao Mei

Music

Reception

Award

References 

Chinese web series
2013 Chinese television series debuts
Chinese comedy television series
Youku original programming